Amy Bower is an American physical oceanographer. She is known for her research on ocean circulation and for being one of the few blind oceanographers.

Career 
Bower is a senior scientist at the Woods Hole Oceanographic Institution in Cape Cod, Massachusetts. As of March 2020, she was the chair of the Physical Oceanography Department. She attended Tufts University as an undergraduate and the University of Rhode Island for her PhD.

Research 
Bower investigates ocean circulation, including thermohaline circulation (the so-called ocean conveyor belt), using research floats. She also goes on research cruises to retrieve the floats. Bower's research covers the Arctic Ocean and Gulf of Mexico, among other locations.

Disability and advocacy 
Bower is legally blind, having lost much of her sight in the past twenty years to juvenile macular degeneration and retinitis pigmentosa, and still has some light perception. She advocates for improved accessibility tools and equal access to information for blind scientists. She started a partnership with Perkins School for the Blind to allow young blind students to fully participate in science classes and meet blind scientists, such as herself. "If they don't ever meet a blind scientist, they're never going to think that they can be one," she told Tufts Now. Bower uses a service dog for navigation.

Awards 

 Massachusetts Unsung Heroine Award, 2010
 Chrysalis Award, Center for Vision Loss, 2011

References 

Scientists with disabilities
American oceanographers
Woods Hole Oceanographic Institution
Living people
Year of birth missing (living people)
21st-century American women scientists
21st-century American scientists
21st-century earth scientists
American blind people
University of Rhode Island alumni
Tufts University alumni